Ernest Nyssens (10 July 1868 – 14 March 1956) was a Belgian homeopath, naturopath, theosophist and vegetarianism activist.

Biography

Nyssens studied homeopathy in the United States which he introduced to Belgium. He was a naturopath who was interested in the ideas of Sebastian Kneipp. In the 1930s he was a bishop in the Free Catholic Church. Nyssens was a pioneer of the theosophical movement in Belgium. In 1897 with Elisabeth Carter, he created the first theosophical branch of Brussels. Between 1910–1915 he was active at a naturist and theosophical institute in Ter Nood, Overijse.

Nyssens was the director of a Theosophical educational community known as "Communauté Monada" at Uccle (1921–1938). The school issued vegetarian food, had a large public garden and the countryside nearby offered beautiful walks. Nyssens taught Swedish gymnastics. The school dissolved at the beginning of World War II.

In 1935, he married Berthe Deseck-Nyssens (1891–1981), secretary general of the Belgian Theosophical Society.

Vegetarianism

Nyssens was a strict vegetarian. He founded the Belgian Vegetarian Society and edited its journal the La Reforme Alimentaire. Nyssens authored the book Du traitement alimentaire du diabete par le regime vegétarien (1901), it was published by the French Vegetarian Society.

Nyssens was a member of the International Vegetarian Union (IVU) Provisional Committee in 1909 and speaker at the 1913 IVU Congress.

Selected publications

 Du Traitement alimentaire du diabète (1900)
 La Cuisine rationnelle, précis d'hygiène alimentaire (1900)

References

1868 births
1956 deaths
Belgian homeopaths
Belgian Theosophists
Naturopaths
People from Chimay
Vegetarianism activists